Miss Polski 2022 is the 33rd edition of Miss Polski held on July 17, 2022. Agata Wdowiak of Łódź crowned Aleksandra Klepaczka of Łódź as her successor at the end of the event.

Final results

Contestants
24 contestants competed for the title of Miss Polski 2022:

Notes

References

External links
Official Website

Miss Polski
2022 beauty pageants
2022 in Poland